Argynnina hobartia, the Hobart brown, is a butterfly of the family Nymphalidae. It is endemic to Tasmania.

The wingspan is about 30 mm.

The larvae feed on various grasses, including Lolium perenne.

Subspecies
Argynnina hobartia hobartia (eastern Tasmania and the mountains)
Argynnina hobartia montana (inland Tasmania in the mountains above 900 meters) 
Argynnina hobartia tasmanica (western Tasmania)

References

Australian Insects

Satyrini
Butterflies described in 1851